The 2010 FIVB Volleyball World League was the 21st edition of the annual men's international volleyball tournament, played by 16 countries from 4 June to 25 July 2010. The Final Round was held in Córdoba, Argentina.

Qualification

Top 14 teams of the 2009 edition directly qualified.
 and  qualified through the qualification.

Pools composition

Pool standing procedure
 Match points
 Number of matches won
 Points ratio
 Sets ratio
 Result of the last match between the tied teams

Match won 3–0 or 3–1: 3 match points for the winner, 0 match points for the loser
Match won 3–2: 2 match points for the winner, 1 match point for the loser

Intercontinental round
All times are local.
The Final Round hosts Argentina, the winners of each pool and the best second among all pools will qualify for the Final Round. If Argentina are ranked first in Pool D, the team ranked second of Pool D will qualify for the Final Round.

Pool A

Week 1

Week 2

Week 3

Week 4

Week 5

Week 6

Pool B

Week 1

Week 2

Week 3

Week 4

Week 5

Week 6

Pool C

Week 1

Week 2

Week 3

Week 4

Week 5

Week 6

Pool D

Week 1

Week 2

Week 3

Week 4

Week 5

Week 6

Final round
Venue:  Orfeo Superdomo, Córdoba, Argentina
All times are Argentina Time (UTC−03:00).

Pool play

Pool E

Pool F

Final four

Semifinals

3rd place match

Final

Final standing

Awards

Most Valuable Player
  Murilo Endres
Best Scorer
  Maxim Mikhaylov
Best Spiker
  Maxim Mikhaylov
Best Blocker
  Dmitriy Muserskiy
Best Server
  Yoandy Leal
Best Setter
  Sergey Grankin
Best Libero
  Mário Pedreira

External links
Official website
Final Standing

2010
2010 in volleyball
International volleyball competitions hosted by Argentina